Bisbal is a surname. Notable people with the surname include:

 David Bisbal (born 1979), Spanish singer, songwriter, and actor
 Gerardo Bisbal (born 1984), Puerto Rican boxer
 Victor Bisbal (born 1980), Puerto Rican boxer